Ian Turner (born 10 October 1949) is a former speedway rider from England.

Speedway career 
Turner reached the final of the British Speedway Championship in 1979. He rode in the top tier of British Speedway from 1969–1980, riding primarily for King's Lynn Stars. He was also the British Junior Champion in 1971.
He retired in 1980 but was tempted back to ride a few matches for Boston Barracudas by promoter, Cyril Crane. Ian appeared in about 12 meetings, with a final appearance against Mildenhall Fen Tigers when he scored maximum points from five rides.
Post speedway, Ian drove lorries for a  living and rode a Harley for a hobby. He has lived in Spalding since 1971.

References 

1949 births
Living people
British speedway riders
Boston Barracudas riders
King's Lynn Stars riders